Lutjanus bohar, the two-spot red snapper, the red bass, twinspot snapper or bohar snapper, is a species of marine ray-finned fish, a snapper belonging to the family Lutjanidae. It has a wide Indo-Pacific distribution.

Taxonomy 
Lutjanus bohar was first formally described as Sciaena bohar in 1775 with no type locality given, although it is thought to be the Red Sea. The description is attributed to the Finnish-born Swedish explorer Peter Forsskål by FishBase, but the Catalog of Fishes attributes as follows

“Fabricius [J. C.] in Niebuhr (ex Forsskål) 1775:46, xi [Descriptiones animalium (Forsskål)”

Catalog of Fishes then states that the valid binomial is Lutjanus bohar (Fabricius, 1775).

The specific name bohar is the Arabic word used for this fish in the Red Sea.

Description
These large reddish tropical snappers show darker fins, a rounded profile of head and a groove running from the nostrils to the eyes. They have 10 dorsal spines and 3 anal spines. Juveniles and some adults have two silvery-white spots (hence the common name) on the back close to their dorsal fins, while larger adults lose the spots and become mostly red. Large adults may cause ciguatera poisoning.

This species is a commercially important species and is also sought-after as a game fish.

Biology
 It is a long-lived and slow-growing species which reaches maturity at 8–9 years, and the oldest recorded individual is 56. These fishes are carnivorous, mostly feeding on other fishes, crustaceans and molluscs.

Adult snappers often form large schools on the outer reefs or above sandy areas, mainly to form spawning aggregations. Small brownish juveniles mimic damselfishes of the genus Chromis in order to approach their prey.

The chambered nautilus, Nautilus pompilius, is known to scavenge deceased snappers. A pair of nautiluses recorded feeding on a snapper at 703 metres below the surface constitutes the deepest recorded sighting of any nautilus species.

Distribution
This species is native to the Indian Ocean. It is widespread in the Indo-Pacific from the east African coast, north to the Red Sea, to the western Pacific Ocean, north to the Ryukyu Islands, south to Australia.

Habitat

Bibliography

 Allen, G.R., 1985. FAO Species Catalogue. Vol. 6. Snappers of the world. An annotated and illustrated catalogue of lutjanid species known to date. FAO Fish. Synop. 125(6):208 p. Rome: FAO.
 Frimodt, C., 1995. Multilingual illustrated guide to the world's commercial coldwater fish. Fishing News Books, Osney Mead, Oxford,. 215 p.
 Fenner, Robert M.: The Conscientious Marine Aquarist. Neptune City, USA: T.F.H. Publications, 2001.
 Helfman, G., B. Collette y D. Facey: The diversity of fishes. Blackwell Science, Malden, Massachusetts, USA, 1997.
 Hoese, D.F. 1986: . A M.M. Smith y P.C. Heemstra (eds.) Smiths' sea fishes. Springer-Verlag, Berlin, Germany.

 Maugé, L.A. 1986. A J. Daget, J.-P. Gosse y D.F.E. Thys van den Audenaerde (eds.) Check-list of the freshwater fishes of Africa (CLOFFA). 
 Moyle, P. y J. Cech.: Fishes: An Introduction to Ichthyology, 4th. Ed., Upper Saddle River, USA: Prentice-Hall. Año 2000.
 Nelson, J.: Fishes of the World, 3rd ed.. New York: John Wiley and Sons. 
 Wheeler, A.: The World Encyclopedia of Fishes, 2nd. Ed. London: Macdonald. 1985.

References

External links
 Animal Diversity Web
 

bohar
Fish described in 1775
Taxa named by Peter Forsskål